Wang Feng may refer to:

Wang Feng (diver) (born 1979), Chinese diver
Wang Feng (canoeist) (born 1985), female Chinese flatwater canoer
Wang Feng (politician) (1910–1998), Secretary of the Communist Party of China Xinjiang Committee, and Chairman of Xinjiang
Wang Feng (singer) (born 1971), Chinese singer-songwriter
Wang Feng (mnemonist) (born 1990), 2010 and 2011 World Memory Champion
Wang Feng (footballer) (born 1956), Chinese footballer
Feng Wang (physicist), American physicist